Miles Webster "Mike" Casteel (December 30, 1895 – March 27, 1977) was an American football player and coach. He played college football as the quarterback at Kalamazoo College and also played one season in the National Football League (NFL) for the Rock Island Independents. He later served as the head football coach at the University of Arizona in from 1939 to 1948, compiling a record of 46–26–3.

Early years
Casteel was born in Elmira, New York. He attended Kalamazoo College where he played football, basketball and track. He also served in the United States Army during World War I, receiving the Silver Star for his performance in the artillery service at Verdun's north front. He returned to Kalamazoo after completing his military service, graduating in 1922.

He played in the National Football League as a back for the Rock Island Independents during the 1922 season, appearing in six games.

Coaching
He began coaching at East Lansing High School in 1923 before joining Michigan Agricultural College as an assistant football coach in 1924. He also served as an assistant track coach at Michigan State and as a scout for the Green Bay Packers and Detroit Lions between 1934 and 1938.

In February 1939, he became the head football coach at the University of Arizona. He held that position until 1948, compiling a 46–26–3 record. In January 1949, the school's board of regents voted to terminate Casteel as head football coach.

Later years
Casteel later served as director of Arizona State University's Sun Angel Foundation from 1950 to 1973. He died in 1977 at age 81.

Head coaching record

References

External links
 

1895 births
1977 deaths
American football quarterbacks
American men's basketball players
Arizona Wildcats football coaches
Kalamazoo Hornets football players
Kalamazoo Hornets men's basketball players
Michigan State Spartans football coaches
Rock Island Independents players
College men's track and field athletes in the United States
College track and field coaches in the United States
United States Army personnel of World War I
Sportspeople from Elmira, New York
People from St. Johns, Michigan
Coaches of American football from Michigan
Players of American football from Michigan
Basketball players from Michigan